The Wild Basin House was built in the southeastern corner of Rocky Mountain National Park in Colorado, USA in 1931. The log residence was built to plans provided by the National Park Service Branch of Plans and Designs at a cost of $2500, in the National Park Service rustic style. The interior comprises three rooms.

The Wild Basin House was placed on the National Register of Historic Places on January 29, 1988. The Wild Basin Ranger Station, also listed on the NRHP, is nearby.

See also
National Register of Historic Places listings in Boulder County, Colorado

References

Houses on the National Register of Historic Places in Colorado
Houses completed in 1931
National Park Service rustic in Colorado
National Register of Historic Places in Rocky Mountain National Park
Houses in Boulder County, Colorado
National Register of Historic Places in Boulder County, Colorado
1931 establishments in Colorado